Rawalpindi Cricket Stadium is a cricket stadium located in DKS Rawalpindi in the Punjab province of Pakistan. It is near to Pir Meher Ali Shah University, Rawalpindi, and Rawalpindi Arts Council, Rawalpindi. The first international match at the stadium was played on 19 January 1992, when Sri Lanka faced Pakistan in an ODI. The stadium hosted its first Test match in 1993, when Zimbabwe were the visitors. 

Test cricket returned to Pakistan at Rawalpindi Cricket Stadium during the two-match test series against Sri Lanka. The first test match was held from 11–15 December 2019 in Rawalpindi Cricket Stadium.

History 
Rawalpindi Cricket Stadium was established in 1992 and replaced Pindi Club Ground as an international stadium. It is the home ground of Islamabad United and Northern. Before the construction of Rawalpindi Cricket Stadium, Rawalpindi Club Cricket Ground had been used as a venue for international matches, including one Test match against New Zealand that was held in March 1965.

Rawalpindi Cricket Stadium was a prime spot in the 1995–96 Cricket World Cup. With an eye on the World Cup of 1996, unveiled another new Test venue for the second Test against Zimbabwe in Rawalpindi. Karachi staged Pakistan's first Test match and Rawalpindi Cricket stadium became the country's 14th Test ground. The flood lights were added in late 2001 when the Australians were set to tour the Region. The stadium is just 20 minutes from the capital Islamabad and is the only proper international stadium in the territory.

Revival of cricket in Pakistan
In April 2018, the Pakistan Cricket Board (PCB) announced that the venue, along with several others in the country, would get a makeover to get them ready for future international matches and fixtures in the Pakistan Super League.

Pakistan vs Sri Lanka Test match
In October 2019, the PCB proposed hosting the two Test matches in Pakistan, instead of the UAE, at venues in Rawalpindi and Karachi. Sri Lanka Cricket said that they were "very positive" with regards to the progress of playing Test cricket in Pakistan. In November 2019, the PCB confirmed the dates and venues for the Test series, with the first test match taking place in Rawalpindi Cricket Stadium from 11 to 15 December. It was the first test match played at this venue after 15 years and first International match after 13 years.

Records 
First Test: Dec 9–14, 1993 – Pakistan v Zimbabwe
First ODI: 19 Jan 1992 – Pakistan v Sri Lanka.
First T20I: 7 Jan 2020 – Pakistan v Zimbabwe.

Tests

One Day Internationals

T20 Internationals

List of five wicket hauls

Key

Tests
Twelve five-wicket hauls have been taken in Test matches at the ground.

One Day Internationals
Five five-wicket hauls have been taken in One Day Internationals at the ground.

See also
 List of stadiums in Pakistan
 List of cricket grounds in Pakistan
 List of sports venues in Karachi
 List of sports venues in Lahore
 List of sports venues in Faisalabad
Pakistan Cricket Board
List of Test cricket grounds

References

External links
 CricketArchive Profile
 

Test cricket grounds in Pakistan
Stadiums in Pakistan
Cricket grounds in Pakistan
1992 establishments in Pakistan
1996 Cricket World Cup stadiums